Heron County Park is a park in Newell Township in Vermilion County, Illinois.  It is located just north of Danville, Illinois on Newell Road, at the north end of Lake Vermilion where the lake's waters are very shallow.  A 950-foot-long floating boardwalk and watchtower which allows visitors to walk through a portion of the wetland. The wetlands were donated by Aqua Illinois Inc.

References

External links
Park website
Vermilion County Conservation District main page

County parks in the United States
Protected areas of Vermilion County, Illinois
2004 establishments in Illinois
Parks in Illinois
Protected areas established in 2004